Patricia Castro Ortega (born 6 August 1992) is a Spanish freestyle and relay swimmer, who was selected to the national team to qualify for the 2012 Summer Olympics in London. She competed in the women's 4 × 200 m freestyle relay, along with her teammates Mireia Belmonte García, Melania Costa, and Lydia Morant. She and her team placed tenth in the heats, with a time of 7:54.59, breaking their national swimming record, but failing to advance into the finals.

Castro is a student at Queens University of Charlotte, and formerly a member of  Club Natació Terrassa

References

Living people
Spanish female freestyle swimmers
Olympic swimmers of Spain
Swimmers at the 2012 Summer Olympics
Swimmers at the 2016 Summer Olympics
Swimmers from Madrid
1992 births
Mediterranean Games gold medalists for Spain
Mediterranean Games bronze medalists for Spain
Mediterranean Games medalists in swimming
Swimmers at the 2009 Mediterranean Games
20th-century Spanish women
21st-century Spanish women